Yerpedu (or Erpedu) is a place situated in Tirupati district of the Indian state of Andhra Pradesh. It is a part of Tirupati suburb and is located near Sri Kalahasti. It falls in the jurisdictional limit of Tirupati Urban Development Authority. It is the mandal headquarters of Yerpedu mandal.

Demographics
Population. (2011) - Total   58,403 - males. 	28,131 - females 	28,272
literacy. (2011) - Total 	62.97% - males 	74.67% - females      51.17%   pin code. 	517619

Geography 

It has an average elevation of 89 meters (295 feet). It is a part of Tirupati suburb and is located near Sri Kalahasti. Yerpedu Railway station is situated here.

References 

Mandal headquarters in Tirupati district
Tirupati